Niphargus is by far the largest genus of its family, the Niphargidae, and the largest of all freshwater amphipod genera.

Usually, these animals inhabit caves or groundwater. They occur in western Eurasia, in regions that were not covered by the Pleistocene ice sheets. They are found throughout most of Europe with the notable exception of the Nordics and they are also largely missing from Iberia. The genus extends into Asia as far as the Arabian Peninsula and Iran. In their main range – the central Mediterranean region through Central and Eastern Europe to the Ukraine – they are among the most significant organisms inhabiting the groundwater. In the Dinaric Alps alone there are at least 45 species. There are also six species in the British Isles (the northernmost Niphargus): N. aquilex, N. fontanus, N. glenniei and N. kochianus of Great Britain, and N. irlandicus and N. wexfordensis of Ireland. Although the individual species often have very small ranges and only live at a narrow water temperature range, the genus includes both species of cold and relatively warm places, taken to the extreme in N. thermalis from thermal waters.

Niphargus are extremely variable in their appearance (more so than even some amphipod families), but are whitish and completely lack eyes. At least some of the species are highly resistant to starvation and able to survive for more than 200 days without food.

Species
The taxonomy of Niphargus is highly complex. The genus contains the following species:

Niphargus abchasicus Martynov, 1932
Niphargus aberrans Sket, 1972
Niphargus ablaskiri Birstein, 1940
Niphargus abricossovi Birstein, 1932
Niphargus adbiptus G. Karaman, 1973
Niphargus adei S. Karaman, 1934
Niphargus affinis Dobreanu, Manolache & Puscariu, 1953
Niphargus aggtelekiensis Dudich, 1932
Niphargus alasonius Derzhavin, 1945
Niphargus alatus G. Karaman, 1973
Niphargus alpinus G. Karaman & Ruffo, 1989
Niphargus altagahizi Alouf, 1973
Niphargus alutensis Dancau, 1971
Niphargus ambulator G. Karaman, 1975
Niphargus anatolicus S. Karaman, 1950
Niphargus andropus Schellenberg, 1940
Niphargus angelieri Ruffo, 1954
Niphargus anticolanus d’Ancona, 1934
Niphargus apuanus Ruffo, 1936
Niphargus aquilex Schioedte, 1855
Niphargus arbiter G. Karaman, 1985
Niphargus arcanus G. Karaman, 1988
Niphargus armatus G. Karaman, 1985
Niphargus asper G. Karaman, 1972
Niphargus auerbachi Schellenberg, 1934
Niphargus aulicus G. S. Karaman, 1991
Niphargus bajuvaricus Schellenberg, 1932
Niphargus balazuci Schellenberg, 1951
Niphargus balcanicus Absolon, 1927
Niphargus baloghi Dudich, 1940
Niphargus banaticus Dobreanu & Manolache, 1936
Niphargus banjanus S. Karaman, 1943
Niphargus barbatus Karaman, 1985
Niphargus bihorensis Schellenberg, 1940
Niphargus bilecanus S. Karaman, 1953
Niphargus biljanae Karaman, 1998
Niphargus birsteini Dedyu, 1963
Niphargus bitoljensis S. Karaman, 1943
Niphargus bodoni Karaman, 1985
Niphargus borkanus S. Karaman, 1960
Niphargus borutzkyi Birstein, 1933
Niphargus boskovici S. Karaman, 1952
Niphargus bosniacus S. Karaman, 1943
Niphargus boulangei Wichers, 1964
Niphargus brachytelson S. Karaman, 1952
Niphargus brevicuspis Schellenberg, 1937
Niphargus brevirostris Sket, 1971
Niphargus brixianus Ruffo, 1937
Niphargus bulgaricus Andreev, 2001
Niphargus bureschi Fage, 1926
Niphargus burgundus Graf & Straskraba, 1967
Niphargus buturovici S. Karaman, 1958
Niphargus caelestis G. Karaman, 1982
Niphargus canui G. Karaman, 1976
Niphargus carcerarius G. Karaman, 1989
Niphargus carniolicus Sket, 1960
Niphargus carpathicus Dobreanu & Manolache, 1939
Niphargus carpathorossicus Straskraba, 1957
Niphargus carsicus Straskraba, 1956
Niphargus casimiriensis Skalski, 1980
Niphargus castellanus S. Karaman, 1960
Niphargus catalogus G. S. Karaman, 1995
Niphargus cavernicolus Dobreanu & Manolache, 1957
Niphargus cepelarensis S. Karaman & G. Karaman, 1959
Niphargus ciliatus Chevreux, 1906
Niphargus cismontanus Margalef, 1952
Niphargus corinae Dedyu, 1963
Niphargus corniculanus Iannilli&Vigna-Taglianti, 2005
Niphargus corsicanus Schellenberg, 1950
Niphargus costozzae Schellenberg, 1935
Niphargus croaticus Jurinac, 1888
Niphargus cubanicus Birstein, 1954
Niphargus cvijici S. Karaman, 1950
Niphargus d’anconai Benedetti, 1942
Niphargus dabarensis Fišer, Trontelj & Sket, 2006
Niphargus dacicus Dancau, 1963
Niphargus dalmatinus Schaferna, 1922
Niphargus danconai Benedetti, 1942
Niphargus danconai S. Karaman, 1954
Niphargus danielopoli Karaman, 1994
Niphargus debilis Ruffo, 1936
Niphargus decui G. Karaman & Sarbu, 1995
Niphargus deelemanae G. Karaman, 1973
Niphargus delamarei Ruffo, 1954
Niphargus derzhavini Birstein, 1952
Niphargus dimorphopus Stock & Gledhill, 1977
Niphargus dimorphus Birstein, 1961
Niphargus dissonus G. Karaman, 1984
Niphargus dobati Sket, 1999
Niphargus dobrogicus Dancau, 1964
Niphargus dojranensis G. Karaman, 1960
Niphargus dolenianesis Lorenzi, 1898
Niphargus dolichopus Fišer, Trontelj & Sket, 2006
Niphargus dubius Dobreanu & Manolache
Niphargus dudichi Hanko, 1924
Niphargus duplus G. Karaman, 1976
Niphargus echion G. Karaman & Gottstein Matočec, 2006
Niphargus effossus Dudich, 1943
Niphargus elegans Garbini, 1894
Niphargus enslini S. Karaman, 1932
Niphargus eugeniae Derzhavin, 1945
Niphargus factor Sket & G. Karaman, 1990
Niphargus fontanus Bate, 1859
Niphargus fongi Fišer & Zagmajster, 2009
Niphargus fontophilus S. Karaman, 1943
Niphargus foreli Humbert, 1877
Niphargus forroi Karaman, 1986
Niphargus galenae Derzhavin, 1939
Niphargus gallicus Schellenberg, 1935
Niphargus galvagnii Ruffo, 1953
Niphargus gebhardti Schellenberg, 1934
Niphargus georgievi S. Karaman & G. Karaman, 1959
Niphargus gineti Bou, 1965
Niphargus glontii Behning, 1940
Niphargus graecus S. Karaman, 1934
Niphargus grandii Ruffo, 1937
† Niphargus groehni Coleman & Myers, 2001
Niphargus gurjanovae Birstein, 1941
Niphargus hadzii Rejic, 1956
Niphargus hebereri Schellenberg, 1933
Niphargus hercegovinensis S. Karaman, 1950
Niphargus hoverlicus Dedyu, 1963
Niphargus hrabei S. Karaman, 1932
Niphargus hungaricus Mehely, 1937
Niphargus hvarensis S. Karaman, 1952
Niphargus ictus G. Karaman, 1985
Niphargus illidzensis Schaferna, 1922
Niphargus incertus Dobreanu, Manolache & Puscariu, 1951
Niphargus inclinatus G. Karaman, 1973
Niphargus inermis Birstein, 1940
Niphargus iniochus Birstein, 1941
Niphargus inopinatus Schellenberg, 1932
Niphargus inornatus Derzhavin, 1945
Niphargus irlandicus Schellenberg, 1932
Niphargus italicus G. Karaman, 1976
Niphargus itus G. Karaman, 1986
Niphargus ivokaramani G. Karaman, 1994
Niphargus jadranko Sket & G. Karaman, 1990
Niphargus jalzici G. Karaman, 1989
Niphargus jaroschenkoi Dedyu, 1963
Niphargus jovanovici S. Karaman, 1931
Niphargus jugoslavicus G. Karaman, 1982
Niphargus jurinaci S. Karaman, 1950
Niphargus karamani Schellenberg, 1935
Niphargus kenki S. Karaman, 1952
Niphargus kieferi Schellenberg, 1936
Niphargus kirgizi Fišer, Çamur-Elipek & Özbek, 2009
Niphargus kochianus Bate, 1859
Niphargus kolombatovici S. Karaman, 1950
Niphargus komareki S. Karaman, 1932
Niphargus korosensis Dudich, 1943
Niphargus kosanini S. Karaman, 1943
Niphargus kragujevensis S. Karaman, 1950
Niphargus krameri Schellenberg, 1935
Niphargus kurdus Derzhavin, 1945
Niphargus kusceri S. Karaman, 1950
Niphargus labacensis Sket, 1956
Niphargus ladmiraulti Chevreux, 1901
Niphargus laisi Schellenberg, 1936
Niphargus laticaudatus Schellenberg, 1940
Niphargus latimanus Birstein, 1952
Niphargus lattingerae G. Karaman, 1983
Niphargus leopoliensis Jaworowski, 1893
Niphargus lessiniensis Stoch, 1998
Niphargus liburnicus G. Karaman & Sket, 1989
Niphargus likanus S. Karaman, 1952
Niphargus lindbergi S. Karaman, 1956
Niphargus longicaudatus A. Costa, 1851
Niphargus longidactylus Ruffo, 1937
Niphargus longiflagellum S. Karaman, 1950
Niphargus lori Derzhavin, 1945
Niphargus lourensis Fišer, Trontelj & Sket, 2006
Niphargus lunaris G. Karaman, 1985
Niphargus macedonicus S. Karaman, 1929
Niphargus magnus Birstein, 1940
Niphargus maximus S. Karaman, 1929
Niphargus mediodanubilais Dudich, 1941
Niphargus medvednicae S. Karaman, 1950
Niphargus melticensis Dancau & Andreev, 1973
Niphargus meridionalis Dobreanu & Manolache, 1942
Niphargus messanai G. Karaman, 1989
Niphargus microcerberus Sket, 1972
Niphargus miljeticus Straškraba, 1959
Niphargus minor Sket, 1956
Niphargus moldavicus Dobreanu, Manolache & Puscariu, 1953
Niphargus molnari Mehely, 1927
Niphargus montellianus Stoch, 1998
Niphargus montenigrinus G. Karaman, 1962
Niphargus multipennatus Sket, 1956
Niphargus nadarini Alouf, 1972
Niphargus nicaensis Isnard, 1916
Niphargus novomestanus S. Karaman, 1952
Niphargus numerus G. Karaman & Sket, 1990
Niphargus occultus G. Karaman, 1993-94
Niphargus ohridanus S. Karaman, 1929
Niphargus orcinus Joseph, 1869
Niphargus orientalis S. Karaman, 1950
Niphargus osogovensis S. Karaman, 1959
Niphargus otharicus Birstein, 1952
Niphargus pachypus Schellenberg, 1933
Niphargus pachytelson Sket, 1960
Niphargus pancici S. Karaman, 1929
Niphargus pannonicus S. Karaman, 1950
Niphargus parapupetta G. Karaman, 1984
Niphargus parenzani Ruffo & Vigna–Taglianti, 1968
Niphargus parvus S. Karaman, 1943
Niphargus pasquinii Vigna-Taglianti, 1966
Niphargus pater Mehely, 1941
Niphargus patrizii Ruffo & Vigna–Taglianti, 1968
Niphargus pavicevici G. Karaman, 1976
Niphargus pecarensis S. Karaman & G. Karaman, 1959
Niphargus pectencoronatae Sket & G. Karaman, 1990
Niphargus pectinicauda Sket, 1971
Niphargus pedemontanus Ruffo, 1937
Niphargus pellagonicus S. Karaman, 1943
Niphargus pescei G. Karaman, 1984
Niphargus petkovskii G. Karaman, 1963
Niphargus petrosani Dobreanu & Manolache, 1933
Niphargus phreaticolus Motas, Dobreanu & Manolache, 1948
Niphargus plateaui Chevreux, 1901
Niphargus pliginskii Martynov, 1930
Niphargus podgoricensis S. Karaman, 1934
Niphargus podpecanus S. Karaman, 1952
Niphargus poianoi G. Karaman, 1988
Niphargus polonicus Schellenberg, 1936
Niphargus poloninicus Straškraba, 1957
Niphargus polymorphus Fišer, Trontelj & Sket, 2006
Niphargus ponoricus Dancau, 1963
Niphargus potamophilus Birstein, 1954
Niphargus pretneri Sket, 1959
Niphargus pseudocaspius G. Karaman, 1982
Niphargus pseudokochianus Dobreanu, Manolache & Puscariu, 1953
Niphargus pseudolatimanus Birstein, 1952
Niphargus pulevici G. Karaman, 1967
Niphargus pupetta Sket, 1962
Niphargus puteanus (C. L. Koch, 1836)
Niphargus rajecensis Schellenberg, 1938
Niphargus ravanicanus S. Karaman, 1943
Niphargus redenseki Sket, 1959
Niphargus rejici Sket, 1958
Niphargus remus G. Karaman, 1992
Niphargus remyi S. Karaman, 1934
Niphargus renei Karaman, 1986
Niphargus rhenorhodanensis Schellenberg, 1937
Niphargus rhodi S. Karaman, 1950
Niphargus robustus Chevreux, 1901
Niphargus romanicus Dobreanu & Manolache, 1942
Niphargus romuleus Vigna-Taglianti, 1968
Niphargus rostratus Sket, 1971
Niphargus rucneri G. Karaman, 1962
Niphargus ruffoi G. Karaman, 1976
Niphargus salonitanus S. Karaman, 1950
Niphargus sanctinaumi S. Karaman, 1943
Niphargus schellenbergi S. Karaman, 1932
Niphargus schusteri G. Karaman, 1991
Niphargus scopicauda Fišer, Coleman, Zagmajster, Zwittnig, Gerecke & Sket, 2010
Niphargus serbicus S. Karaman, 1960
Niphargus sertaci Fišer, Çamur-Elipek & Özbek, 2009
Niphargus setiferus Schellenberg, 1937
Niphargus sibillinianus G. Karaman, 1984
Niphargus similis G. Karaman & Ruffo, 1989
Niphargus sketi G. Karaman, 1966
Niphargus skopljensis S. Karaman, 1929
Niphargus slovenicus S. Karaman, 1932
Niphargus smederevanus S. Karaman, 1950
Niphargus smirnovi Birstein, 1952
Niphargus sodalis G. Karaman, 1984
Niphargus somesensis Motas, Dobreanu & Manolache, 1948
Niphargus speziae Schellenberg, 1936
Niphargus sphagnicolus Rejic, 1956
Niphargus spinulifemur S. Karaman, 1954
Niphargus spoeckeri Schellenberg, 1933
Niphargus stadleri S. Karaman, 1932
Niphargus stankoi G. Karaman, 1974
Niphargus stebbingi Cecchini
Niphargus stefanellii Ruffo & Vigna-Taglianti, 1968
Niphargus stenopus Sket, 1960
Niphargus steueri Schellenberg, 1935
Niphargus stochi G. Karaman, 1994
Niphargus strouhali Schellenberg, 1933
Niphargus stygius Schiodte, 1847 – type species
Niphargus stygocharis Dudich, 1943
Niphargus submersus Derzhavin, 1945
Niphargus subtypicus Sket, 1960
Niphargus talikadzei Giliarov, Lagidze, Levushkin & Talikadze, 1974
Niphargus tamaninii Ruffo, 1953
Niphargus tatrensis Wrzesniowsky, 1888
Niphargus tauri Schellenberg, 1933
Niphargus tauricus Birstein, 1964
Niphargus tenuicaudatus Schellenberg, 1940
Niphargus thermalis Dudich, 1941
Niphargus thienemanni Schellenberg, 1934
Niphargus thuringius Schellenberg, 1934
Niphargus timavi S. Karaman, 1954
Niphargus toplicensis Andreev, 1966
Niphargus transitivus Sket, 1971
Niphargus transsylvanicus Schellenberg, 1934
Niphargus tridentinus Stoch, 1998
Niphargus trullipes Sket, 1958
Niphargus vadimi Birstein, 1961
Niphargus valachicus Dobreanu & Manolache, 1933
Niphargus vandeli Barbe, 1961
Niphargus variabilis Dobreanu, Manolache & Puscariu, 1953
Niphargus velesensis S. Karaman, 1943
Niphargus versluysi S. Karaman, 1950
Niphargus vinodolensis Fišer, Sket & Stoch, 2006
Niphargus virei Chevreux, 1896
Niphargus vjeternicensis S. Karaman, 1932
Niphargus vlkanovi S. Karaman & G. Karaman, 1959
Niphargus vodnensis S. Karaman, 1943
Niphargus vornatscheri Schellenberg, 1934
Niphargus vranjinae G. Karaman, 1967
Niphargus vulgaris G. Karaman, 1968
Niphargus wexfordensis Karaman, Gledhill & Holmes, 1994
Niphargus wolfi Schellenberg, 1933
Niphargus zagrebensis S. Karaman, 1950
Niphargus zavalanus S. Karaman, 1950
Niphargus zorae G. Karaman, 1967

References

Niphargidae
Crustacean genera
Taxa named by Jørgen Matthias Christian Schiødte
Taxonomy articles created by Polbot